Kadapa is a city in the southern part of Andhra Pradesh, India. It is located in the Rayalaseema region, and is the district headquarters of YSR Kadapa district. As of the 2022 Census of India, the city had a population of 466,000, a 2.42% increase from 2021. The city is surrounded on three sides by the Nallamala and Palkonda Hills lying on the tectonic landscape between the Eastern and Western ghats. Black and Red ferrous soils occupy the region. The city is nicknamed "Gadapa" ('threshold') since it is the gateway from the west to the hills of Tirumala.

Kadapa has been under different rulers in its history, including the Cholas, the Vijayanagara Empire and Kingdom of Mysore.

Etymology 

The city's name originated from the Telugu word "Gadapa" meaning threshold or gate.  It acquired this name with its relation to the Tirumala Hills; one had to pass through this city in the olden days to reach Tirumala Hills. In Telugu, the word Gadapa means a threshold and over time, the name evolved into Kadapa. It was spelled "Cuddapah" but was changed to "Kadapa" on 19 August 2005 to reflect the local pronunciation of the name. Some of the inscriptions found recently have mentioned about this place as Hiranyanagaram as well as there are official records that show it was also called Nekanamabad.dilazak empire

History

Post classical era (200–800 AD) 
The history of Kadapa dates back to the second century BC. The evidences of Archaeological Survey of India suggest that it started with Mourya and Satavahana dynasty. And since then it has been under the rule of numerous dynasties including Chalukya, Cholas and Pallava. Among all of these dynasties, first one to rule over Kadapa was Pallava dynasty. Pallava kings ruled over the city during the fifth century after penetrating into North of Kadapa. After that Cholas ruled till the eighth century after defeating Pallavas. Later Banas ruled over Kadapa.

Era (8th to 18th centuries AD) 

After Banas, Rashtrakutas ruled Kadapa region Among the popular rulers of Kadapa was King Indra III, who served during the period of 915 AD. In his period, Kadapa gained a lot of power and influence, which declined with his death later. Telugu Cholas, were the next one to rule Kadapa. Ambadeva ruled Kadapa in the latter half of the 13th century when he established the capital at Vallur, which is located at a distance of about 15 km from Kadapa.

After the death of Ambadeva, the Kakatiya king Prataparudra II ruled until the early 14th century. Prataparudra was defeated by Muslims in the reign of Khalji emperor Alla Uddin. Later in the mid-14th century, Hindus of Vijayanagar dynasty drove the Muslims out of Warangal and subsequently Kadapa and ruled for around two centuries till they were defeated by the Gulbarga sultans. The most illustrious ruler during this time was Pemmasani Thimma Nayudu (1422 CE) who developed the region and constructed many tanks and temples here. Muslims of Golkonda conquered the region in 1594 when Mir Jumla II raided Gandikota fort and defeated Chinna Thimma Nayudu by treachery. Marathas took over the city in 1740 after defeating the Nawab of Kurnool and Cuddapah.

Hyder Ali and Tipu Sultan also ruled the city (1784-1792) before it fell in the hands of Nizam by the Treaty of Seringapatam in 1792.
Tipu's grandmother, Hyder Ali’s mother Fatima Fakhr-un-Nisa was the daughter of Mir Muin-ud-Din, the governor of the fort of Kadapa.

Later the British took control of Kadapa District in 1800 CE. Although the town is an ancient one, it was probably extended by dilazak Neknam Khan, the Qutb Shahi commander, who called the extension as "Neknamabad". The name "Neknamabad" was used for the town for some time but slowly fell into disuse and the records of the 18th century refer to the rulers not as "Nawab of Kadapa". Except for some years in the beginning, Kadapa District was the seat of the Mayana Nawabs in the 18th century. With the British occupation of the tract in 1800 CE, it became the headquarters of one of the four subordinate collectorates under the principal collector Sir Thomas Munro. In 2004, Kadapa was recognised as a municipal corporation.

Geography

Topography 
Kadapa in the Rayalaseema region of Andhra Pradesh is located at  about 412 km from Hyderabad, 260 km from Chennai, 250 km from Bangalore and 360 km from Vijayawada. The city is situated in the Bugga vanka or Ralla Vanka rivers bordered by the Palakondas to the south and to the east by a patch of hills casting north for the Lankamalas on Penna's other side. It has an average elevation of 138 metres (452 ft). Veligonda hills separates the districts of Nellore and Kadapa.

Climate 
Kadapa has a hot semi-arid (Köppen BSh) climate characterised by year round high temperatures. It has a record of reaching more than 46 degree Celsius. Summers are especially uncomfortable with hot and humid conditions. Humidity is around 75% during the summer months. The monsoon season brings substantial rain to the area, and Kadapa gets some rainfall from both the southwest monsoon and the northeast monsoon. About  of the average total annual rainfall of around  occurs between June and October. Winters are comparatively milder and the temperatures are lower after the onset of the monsoons. Humidity is much lower during the winter season, which is the best time to visit the area.

Demographics 

The population of Kadapa was first counted in 1871 during the first census of India, which was held until 1911 (pg 176). However, after no historical records are available until 1961.
Kadapa is one of the largest and fastest developing cities in Andhra Pradesh. As per the 1991 census the population of the town was 1,21,463. It didn't increase much as per the 2001 census which recorded 1,26,505 lakhs for 20 wards population with an average decadal growth rate of 0.36 per cent. Later it was converted to a Municipal Corporation in 2005. As per provisional data of 2011 census, Kadapa urban agglomeration has a population of 344,078, out of which males are 172,969 and females are 171,109. The literacy rate is 79.34 per cent. The urban population has 50% Hindus, 47% Muslims and 3% Christians.-

Languages 
Telugu and Urdu are the official languages in the city. Hindi is also spoken in many areas of the city among North Indian traders. English is also gaining popularity. Urdu is spoken throughout the city, especially by its large Muslim population.

Administration

Local government 

The Kadapa Municipal Corporation oversees the civic needs of the city and was constituted in the year 2005. It has 50 municipal wards represented by a corporator through direct election, who in turn elects the Mayor. The District court is located in the city itself.

Culture 

The city has rich culture and heritage with the influence of different dynasties. There are different rituals, customs and traditions with the existence of different religions such as, Hinduism, Islam, Christianity, Buddhism and Jainism. The city is known for its historic Devuni Kadapa and Ameen Peer Dargah.

Arts and crafts 

Shilparamam is a crafts village situated in the outskirts of Kadapa.

Cuisine 
Kadapa is well known for its spicy and culinary food which is very similar to the South Indian food. Karam dosa is one of the most favourite item of kadapa citizens. People have dosa, idly, sambar and chutney in their breakfast. Rice, daal and curry is usually served as lunch. Most of the restaurants serve South Indian thali including these dishes in their lunch and dinner menu. Although it has a South Indian touch in its dishes it also has a diverse variety of its own which include Ragi Sangati or Ragi Mudda, Boti Curry, Natukodi Chicken, Paya Curry etc. Ragi sangati with chicken curry is the staple food in Kadapa and is also one of the most famous dishes in the city. Many other varieties of dishes can also be found in the local restaurants. Like many other cities of India fast food is also increasing its reach in the city.

Economy 

The economy of city is largely based on Agriculture crops like ground nut, cotton, red gram, Bengal gram are grown here and Mining. Being a district headquarters all types of Government departments are situated within the city. For most of the families the source of income is through the Government jobs and Private sector jobs in various departments including Business Shops, Hospitality industry, Marketing . Apart from these Tourism also forms a part of economy to the city. Kadapa is one of the 49 metropolitan clusters selected by McKinsey & Company as growth hotspots in India.

Education 
The primary and secondary school education is imparted by government, aided and private schools of the School Education Department of the state.

Institutions 

 Rajiv Gandhi Institute of Medical Sciences, Kadapa
 KSRM College of Engineering
 Yogi Vemana University
 Fathima institute of Medical Sciences

Transport 
Kadapa City is well connected by Road, Rail and Air.

Roadways 

Kadapa has good road connectivity to the other major places like Hyderabad, Bangalore, Chennai, Visakhapatnam, Vijayawada, Rajahmundry, Kakinada, Nellore, Kurnool. APSRTC provides bus services to various destinations of the Kadapa district and other cities across South India. The city has a total road length of 803.84 km.

Railways 

Kadapa has its own railway station in the city. It is one of the Earliest Railway station in the state opened around 1866. The Mumbai–Chennai line which happens to be one of the busiest lines in the south coast region passes through Kadapa railway station. It is one of the A category railway station in South Coast Railway zone under Guntakal railway division. A new railway line Kadapa–Bangalore section is under construction stage. As of August 2021, there is no direct train to Bengaluru from Kadapa, although occasional special trains and diverted trains do connect them. Neither are flights to Bengaluru available earlier, however, Indigo started its operations at Kadapa airport connecting the city to Bengaluru(along with Chennai, Hyderabad, Vizag). Kadapa is well connected by road so bus services are widely used.

Airways 

Kadapa Airport was opened for air traffic on 7 June 2015. It's located at a distance of 12 km north west of the city.

See also 
 List of Urban Agglomerations in Andhra Pradesh
 List of municipal corporations in Andhra Pradesh

References

External links 

 Official Website

 
Cities in Andhra Pradesh
District headquarters of Andhra Pradesh